The Passions is an album by Les Baxter featuring vocals by Bas Sheva. It was released in 1954 on the Capitol label (catalog nos. LAL-486). From February through December 1954, it was included in Billboards chart of the top five Best Selling Specialized High-Fidelity Albums.

Track listing
Side 1
 "Despair"
 "Ecstasy"
 "Hate"

Side 2
 "Lust"
 "Terror"
 "Jealousy"
 "Joy"

References

1954 albums
Capitol Records albums
Les Baxter albums